The Europe/Africa Zone was one of three zones of regional Federation Cup qualifying competition in 1993. All ties were played at the City of Nottingham Tennis Centre in Nottingham, England on hard courts.

The twenty-two teams were divided into three pools of four and two pools of five to compete in round-robin matches. After each of the ties had been played, the teams that finished first and second in each of the respective pools would then move on to the play-off stage of the competition. The five teams that won a play-off match would go on to advance to the World Group.

Pool Stage
Date: 10–14 May

Play-offs

Date: 15 May

References

 Fed Cup Profile, Croatia
 Fed Cup Profile, Turkey
 Fed Cup Profile, Malta
 Fed Cup Profile, Belgium
 Fed Cup Profile, Ireland
 Fed Cup Profile, Norway
 Fed Cup Profile, Great Britain
 Fed Cup Profile, Russia
 Fed Cup Profile, Luxembourg
 Fed Cup Profile, Ukraine
 Fed Cup Profile, Latvia
 Fed Cup Profile, Hungary
 Fed Cup Profile, Romania
 Fed Cup Profile, Israel
 Fed Cup Profile, Slovenia
 Fed Cup Profile, Greece
 Fed Cup Profile, Zimbabwe

See also
Fed Cup structure

 
Europe Africa
Sport in Nottingham
Tennis tournaments in England
1993 in English tennis